In finance, a dead cat bounce is a small, brief recovery in the price of a declining stock. Derived from the idea that "even a dead cat will bounce if it falls from a great height", the phrase is also popularly applied to any case where a subject experiences a brief resurgence during or following a severe decline.  This may also be known as a "sucker rally".

History
The earliest citation of the phrase in the news media dates to December 1985 when the Singaporean and Malaysian stock markets bounced back after a hard fall during the recession of that year. Journalists Chris Sherwell and Wong Sulong of the London-based Financial Times were quoted as saying the market rise was "what we call a dead cat bounce". Both the Singaporean and Malaysian economies continued to fall after the quote, although both economies recovered in the following years.

The phrase was used again the following year about falling oil prices. In the San Jose Mercury News, Raymond F. DeVoe Jr. proposed that "Beware the Dead Cat Bounce" be printed on bumper stickers and followed up with a graphic explanation.  This quote was referenced throughout the 1990s and became widely used in the 2000s.

The phrase is also used in political circles for a candidate or policy that shows a small positive bounce in approval after a hard and fast decline.

Variations and usage

The standard usage of the term refers to a short rise in the price of a stock that has suffered a fall. In other instances, the term is used exclusively to refer to securities or stocks that are considered to be of low value. First, the securities have poor past performance. Second, the decline is "correct" in that the underlying business is weak (e.g. declining sales or shaky financials). Along with this, it is doubtful that the security will recover with better conditions (overall market or economy).

Some variations on the definition of the term include:

A stock in a severe decline has a sharp bounce off the lows.
A small upward price movement in a bear market after which the market continues to fall.

Technical analysis
A "dead cat bounce" price pattern may be used as a part of the technical analysis method of stock trading. Technical analysis describes a dead cat bounce as a continuation pattern in which a reversal of the current decline occurs followed by a significant price recovery. The price fails to continue upward and instead falls again downwards and surpasses the previous low. This phenomenon can be difficult to identify at the time of occurrence, and like market peaks and troughs, it is usually only with hindsight that the pattern is able to be recognised.

See also

Don't fight the tape
Market trend
Double-dip recession
Dead cat strategy

References

Financial markets
Metaphors referring to cats
Technical analysis
1985 neologisms